Herizen F. Guardiola (born July 24, 1996) is an American singer, songwriter, and actress. She is known for her breakout role as Mylene Cruz on the Netflix original series, The Get Down. Inspired by her reggae musician father, Johnny Dread, Herizen has also been featured on numerous musical projects, including Absofacto's "ThousandPeaces" EP, the soundtrack for The Get Down, and the official soundtrack for the Major Lazer documentary "Give Me Future." By October 2018, she released her first EP, Come Over To My House. Three months later, she was featured on What So Not's single, "We Can Be Friends." Most recently in April 2019, she released her latest single, "Focus."

Early life
Guardiola is a native of Miami, Florida. Her father, Juan Carlos Guardiola, stage named (Johnny Dread), is a reggae musician of Cuban descent, and her mother, Venice Pink, of Jamaican descent, is a nutritionist and yoga instructor. Guardiola has two younger sisters.

Career
Herizen Guardiola made her acting debut in The Get Down, a Netflix original series from Baz Luhrmann. About her discovery, Luhrmann said, "It's always thrilling to find a fresh unknown talent, particularly one who is not only a terrific actor but a magnificent vocalist."
Herizen Guardiola also played in the show Dare Me, in which she played Addy Hanlon, one of the main roles of the show. In 2021, Herizen Guardiola played singer Tara Riley on season 23, episode 3 on Law & Order’s SVU.

Soundtrack appearances

Filmography

References

External links
 

1996 births
Actresses from Miami
American people of Cuban descent
American people of Jamaican descent
American women pop singers
American television actresses
Living people
Musicians from Miami
21st-century American women singers
21st-century American singers